Isolopha is a monotypic snout moth genus. It was described by George Hampson in 1895 and contains the species Isolopha lactealis. It is found in the West Indies.

References

Epipaschiinae
Monotypic moth genera
Moths of the Caribbean
Pyralidae genera